Ali Baba Bunny is a 1957 Warner Bros. Merrie Melodies short directed by Chuck Jones. The short was released on February 9, 1957, and stars Bugs Bunny and Daffy Duck.

In 1994, it was voted #35 of the 50 Greatest Cartoons of all time by members of the animation field.

The film was edited into the Looney Tunes greatest hits features The Bugs Bunny/Road Runner Movie in 1979 and Bugs Bunny's 3rd Movie: 1001 Rabbit Tales in 1982.

Plot
In the Arabian Desert, a rich Sultan stores his treasure in a cave and leaves his dimwitted guard Hassan to watch the cave. As the Sultan leaves, a burrowing trail crosses the desert towards the cave, bumps into Hassan's sword, and enters the cave. Enraged, Hassan tries to open the cave's door, but has trouble remembering the command to do so ("Open sesame"). While he tries random words beginning with 's' ("Open sarsaparilla? Open Saskatchewan?"), Bugs Bunny and his traveling companion Daffy Duck emerge from the burrow, believing they have arrived at Pismo Beach, they missed that left turn at Albuquerque (and a right one at La Jolla). Daffy's complaints about traveling underground and arriving at the wrong place end when he is mesmerized by the riches. Determined to keep it all for himself, he forces Bugs back into the burrow and eagerly indulges himself, jumping into the pile of treasure.

Hassan eventually says the correct command ("Open septuagenerian? Open, uh, saddle soap? Uh, open sesame?") and marches in, mistaken by Daffy as a porter. After being attacked, Daffy flees in terror and attempts to bribe Bugs into saving his life. When Bugs ignores him, Daffy urges Hassan to attack Bugs instead, but Bugs disguises himself as a genie and fools Hassan into believing the treasure is his to claim for freeing him. Unwilling to give up the treasure, Daffy steals a large gem, and Hassan chases him. Daffy begs Bugs to save him, and Bugs reluctantly complies while berating Daffy for his greed. He sets up an Indian rope trick behind a rock and misleads Hassan up the rope. As Hassan disappears into the clouds, Bugs pulls the rope down, seemingly trapping him there permanently. Daffy runs back into the cave to claim the treasure.

After emptying the treasure, Daffy notices an oil lamp and polishes it. When a real and grateful genie appears, Daffy forces him back into the lamp, believing the genie is after the treasure, but the genie manages to blast back out of the lamp, now promising dire consequences for the duck's desecration as Bugs, knowing that not even he can rescue Daffy this time, hurriedly escapes via the burrow. Daffy shrugs off the genie's threats before the genie zaps him with bolts of magic. Later, in Pismo Beach, Bugs discovers Daffy's ultimate fate after finding a pearl in a clam: Daffy, shrunk to a few inches in height, claims the pearl as his own. The cartoon ends with Bugs making the clam close on the duck by saying "Oh, brudder. Close sesame!"

Voice cast
Mel Blanc as Bugs Bunny, Daffy Duck, Hassan, Sultan and Genie

Reception
Linda Simensky writes, "Ali Baba Bunny was produced in an era where Bugs and Daffy were often paired up, and while that didn't always work, in this cartoon they seem to be formidable opponents. In the early 1950s, Daffy Duck was no longer just daffy. He had progressed to being greedy, cheap, and without a trace of empathy. When put in the right circumstances, this worked. Bugs, as paired up with Daffy, lost a little of his ability to incite conflict, being given the job of mostly reacting and politely suffering Daffy's outbursts. But in this cartoon, Bugs has his classic moments too."

In popular culture
During his SportsCenter tenure, Rich Eisen would occasionally use Hassan's catchphrase, "Hassan chop!", when a highlight showed a baseball player tossing his bat in disgust.

The Offspring's 2021 album Let the Bad Times Roll features a song titled "Hassan Chop", which uses audio from the episode.

See also
 List of American films of 1957

References

External links 

 

1957 films
1957 animated films
1957 short films
Films based on Ali Baba
American parody films
Fairy tale parody films
Films about size change
Genies in film
Short films directed by Chuck Jones
Merrie Melodies short films
Warner Bros. Cartoons animated short films
Bugs Bunny films
Daffy Duck films
Films scored by Carl Stalling
Films scored by Milt Franklyn
Films set in deserts
Films set on beaches
Films set in the Arabian Peninsula
1950s Warner Bros. animated short films
Films with screenplays by Michael Maltese
Films produced by Edward Selzer
1950s English-language films